The Eugene Symphony is an American orchestra based in Eugene, Oregon. Its home venue is the Silva Concert Hall at the Hult Center for the Performing Arts. Approximately 27,000 people attend Eugene Symphony's classical and pops concert performances each year.

The current conductor is Francesco Lecce-Chong. The Eugene Symphony is a resident company of the Hult Center for the Performing Arts and performs in the center's Silva Hall in downtown Eugene and Cuthbert Amphitheater located near Alton Baker Park.

See also
List of symphony orchestras in the United States

References

External links
Eugene Symphony web site

Musical groups from Eugene, Oregon
Orchestras based in Oregon